Mintoo Das (born 26 August 1966) is an Indian former cricketer. He played 23 first-class matches for Bengal between 1985 and 1994.

See also
 List of Bengal cricketers

References

External links
 

1966 births
Living people
Indian cricketers
Bengal cricketers
Cricketers from Kolkata